Giovanni Rosa (died 1448) was a Roman Catholic prelate who served as Bishop of Mazara del Vallo (1415–1448).

Biography
Giovanni Rosa was ordained a priest in the Order of Friars Minor. In 1415, he was appointed by Pope Gregory XII as Bishop of Mazara del Vallo.  He served as Bishop of Mazara del Vallo until his death in 1448.

While bishop, he was the principal consecrator of Matteo da Gimara, Bishop of Agrigento.

References

External links and additional sources
 (for Chronology of Bishops) 
 (for Chronology of Bishops) 

15th-century Italian Roman Catholic bishops
1448 deaths
Bishops appointed by Pope Gregory XII
Franciscan bishops